Petrus Visagie (25 April 1922 – 1967) was a Kenyan sports shooter. He competed in the 50 metre rifle, prone event at the 1960 Summer Olympics.

References

1922 births
1967 deaths
Kenyan male sport shooters
Olympic shooters of Kenya
Shooters at the 1960 Summer Olympics
Place of birth missing